Diego Muhammad bin Robbie Michiels or Diego Michiels (born 8 August 1990 in Deventer, Netherlands) is a professional footballer who plays as a defender for Liga 1 club Borneo Samarinda. Born in the Netherlands, he represented Indonesia at international level.

International career
Michiels was born in the Netherlands to an Indonesian father and Dutch mother. In 2011, he and Joey Suk were invited by the Indonesian Football Association to play for the Indonesia national under-23 football team in Jakarta. According to the newspaper report, he was interested in joining the Indonesian national team, even though he would have to give up his Dutch passport. Along with Joey and Ruben Wuarbanaran, he was able to play for Indonesia, making his full debut in 2014 FIFA World Cup qualification against Bahrain on 29 February 2012.

Career statistics

Club

International

Honours

Country honours
Indonesia U-23
Southeast Asian Games  Silver medal: 2011, 2013
Islamic Solidarity Games  Silver medal: 2013

Personal life
On November 9, 2012, Diego allegedly violated two criminal code articles on assault in a Jakarta nightclub and faced at least three months and twenty days in jail. On March 7, 2013, he was released from jail.

He converted to Islam in 2013 and took the Islamic name Diego Muhammad bin Robbie Michiels.

References

External links
 

1990 births
Living people
Footballers from Deventer
Indonesian footballers
Indonesia international footballers
Indonesia youth international footballers
Dutch footballers
Indonesian people of Dutch descent
Dutch people of Indonesian descent
Indonesian expatriate footballers
Naturalised citizens of Indonesia
Dutch emigrants to Indonesia
Converts to Islam
Indonesian former Christians
Indonesian Muslims
Indo people
Eerste Divisie players
Liga 1 (Indonesia) players
Indonesian Premier League players
Go Ahead Eagles players
Pelita Jaya FC players
Persija Jakarta (IPL) players
Arema F.C. players
Sriwijaya F.C. players
Mitra Kukar players
Borneo F.C. players
Association football defenders
Southeast Asian Games silver medalists for Indonesia
Southeast Asian Games medalists in football
Competitors at the 2011 Southeast Asian Games
Competitors at the 2013 Southeast Asian Games